Prestongrange Parish Church is a Church of Scotland kirk situated in the small, former mining town of Prestonpans in East Lothian. The church was built in 1596, one of the first churches to be built in Scotland following the Scottish Reformation in 1560. In 1606, Prestonpans was created a parish in its own right following centuries of being part of the parish of Tranent.

There had been a church to the south of Prestonpans, since the 12th century which was administered by the canons of Holyrude Abbey but that church, situated in the vicinity of Northfield House was destroyed by the earl of Hertford in 1544 during the Rough Wooing campaign against the Scots following the Scots' refusal to allow Princess Mary of Scotland. (the to-be Mary, Queen of Scots) marry Henry's son, Prince Edward.

Notable ministers 

John Davidson, formerly of Liberton in Edinburgh was appointed first minister at the new church and financed the building of the church out of his own means. The land was gifted by the Hamilton family, the lairds of Preston. The Rev. Davidson was an outspoken man and was never afraid to criticise bishops when the need arose and even criticised the king, James VI of Scots. The good minister spent time in prison in Edinburgh in 1601 and, on his release, was banned from leaving the parish for life. The church, since 1596, has been served by 27 ministers. William Carlyle, father of Jupiter Carlyle, was minister at the time of the Battle of Prestonpans on September 21, 1745 and he wrote a report of the engagement having witnessed it from the church tower. William Bruce Cunningham was minister when the churches split in 1843. The Rev. J. Struthers was minister for 45 years around the end of the 19th century and the early 20th century. Moira Herkes was the first lady minister at Prestonpans when she arrived in 1988.

Changes 

The church was extensively refurbished in 1774 and again in 1891 forming the edifice we see today. Only the clock tower and some surrounding masonry remains from the original 1596 church; the outline of the original west gable end can still be seen inside the roof.

There was a major rift in the Church of Scotland and, in 1843, many of the congregation left the church, then known by its original name, Preston Church. The dissidents, led by the incumbent minister William Bruce Cunningham, eventually built their own church, the Free Church of Scotland, later the United Free Church, in West Loan, just a few hundred yards from Preston Kirk. When the Church of Scotland and the United Free Church reunited in 1929, the former United Free Church congregation took the name Grange Church. Happily, the two congregations re-united in 1981 to form Prestongrange Parish Church.

There are many interesting and intriguing grave stones in the kirkyard where a number of former ministers and even soldiers from the Battle of Prestonpans are buried.

References and further reading 

Prestonpans and Vicinity. Historical, Ecclesiastical and Traditional - Peter McNeill *
New Statistical Accounts for Scotland - 1799 - 1835 *
Prestongrange Parish Church Website *
Prestonpans - University Press - Tales of the Pans/Prestongrange Church *
The Buildings of Scotland - Lothian except Edinburgh - Colin McWilliam - 1978 *

Listed churches in Scotland
Category A listed buildings in East Lothian
Churches in East Lothian
Prestonpans